Kevin MacLeod (born September 28, 1972) is an American composer and music producer. MacLeod has composed over 2,000 pieces of royalty-free library music and made them available under a Creative Commons copyright license. This licensing allows anyone to use his music for free, as long as he receives credit for the song, and has led to his music being used in thousands of films, millions of videos on YouTube, and in video games such as Kerbal Space Program. As of 2017, his music is featured on one of the live feeds from the International Space Station, Earth From Space. One of his compositions, "Monkeys Spinning Monkeys", is among the most-played on TikTok; from January through June 2021 it was played over 31.6 billion times. Because of his amount of compositions, and frequent use, he is likely one of the most listened to musicians of all time, however it is nearly impossible to get an exact number due to the amount of times his music has been used.

Early life
MacLeod was born on September 28, 1972, in Green Bay, Wisconsin. He went to the University of Wisconsin–Green Bay, where he studied music education.

Career

Music distribution
MacLeod states that he releases his music under Creative Commons licenses to maximize the number of people who can use his music. On his website's FAQ, he expressed disdain for the current state of copyright; he hopes to create "an alternate body of works that is able to compete with them".

MacLeod's most popular license is the CC BY; his music is free to use but must be credited. A no-attribution license is also available for people who are unwilling or unable to provide credit to MacLeod; the license costs $30 for one song, $50 for two songs, and $20 per song for three or more songs.

MacLeod has also created FreePD.com, which collects new public domain sound recordings by various artists. Rather than waiting for old copyrights to expire, he hopes to provide a quality library of modern recorded works by artists who explicitly release their music into the public domain. Some of MacLeod's own music is available on the website as well; he explains that these songs are "not commercially viable in the traditional sense, and just add clutter [on his primary website] which hinders people in finding the pieces that they may want."

Subject of documentary
MacLeod is the subject of a documentary film titled Royalty Free: The Music of Kevin MacLeod. The film had a limited release in October 2020. Ryan Camarda, the film's director and producer, ran a fundraising campaign on Kickstarter with a goal of $30,000; by the end of the campaign, 524 backers had pledged a total of $30,608. According to the Kickstarter page, the amount was needed for transportation in order to conduct in-person interviews with the various subjects featured in the film. The documentary has received positive reviews from critics.

Awards and accolades
In 2015, MacLeod was awarded the International Honorary Web Video Award at the 2015 German Web Video Awards by the European Web Video Academy for his lifetime achievement in influencing the German web video community.

Discography

Albums 

 2006: Dorney Rock
 2006: Missing Hits 2
 2012: Cuentos de Recuperación (with Sonia Echezuria)
 2014: Horror Soundscapes
 2014: Highland Strands
 2014: Ghostpocalypse
 2014: Calming
 2014: Hard Electronic
 2014: Madness and Paranoia
 2014: PsychoKiller
 2014: Supernatural Haunting
 2014: The Ambient
 2014: Cephalopod
 2014: Dark World
 2014: Disco Ultralounge
 2014: Polka! Polka! Polka!
 2014: Primal Drive
 2014: Sadness
 2014: The Descent
 2014: Dark Continent
 2014: Wonders
 2014: Action Cuts
 2014: Aspiring
 2014: Light Electronic
 2014: Medium Electronic
 2014: Mystery
 2014: Tenebrous Brothers Carnival
 2014: Atlantean Twilight
 2014: Healing
 2014: Latinesque
 2014: Take the Lead
 2014: Thatched Villagers
 2014: Happyrock
 2014: Music to Delight
 2014: Silent Film: Light Collection
 2014: Vadodara
 2014: Bitter Suite
 2014: Comedy Scoring
 2014: Double Drift
 2014: Reunited
 2014: Funkorama
 2014: Oddities
 2014: Silent Film: Dark Collection
 2015: Christmas!
 2015: Darkness
 2015: Exhilarate
 2015: Film Noire
 2015: Netherworld Shanty
 2015: Romance
 2015: Video Classica
 2015: Virtutes Instrumenti
 2015: Ossuary
 2015: Pixelland
 2016: Maccary Bay
 2016: Mystic Force
 2016: Anamalie
 2016: Final Battle
 2016: Carpe Diem
 2016: Groovy
 2016: Mesmerize
 2016: Traveller
 2017: Shadowlands
 2017: Destruction Device
 2017: Spirit
 2017: Ferret
 2017: Teh Jazzes
 2017: Miami Nights
 2018: Spring Chicken
 2018. Sheep Reliability
 2019: Meditation
 2019: Epic
 2019: The Complete Game Music Bundle
 2019: Complete Collection (Creative Commons)
 2020: SCP-XXX
 2020: Relaxx
 2021: Missing Hits
 2021: The Waltzes
 2021: Missing Hits C to E
 2021: Missing Hits N to R
 2021: Missing Hits Calmness
 2021: Missing Hits F to J
 2021: Missing Hits K to M
 2021: Missing Hits A to B
 2021: Missing Hits S to T
 2021: Missing Hits U to Z

Singles and EPs 

 2011: The Cannery
 2013: Happy Bee
 2014: Tranquility 5
 2014: Sneaky Snitch
 2014: Fluffing a Duck
 2014: Orrganic Meditation
 2014: Touching Moments
 2014: Impact
 2015: Guts and Bourbon
 2015: Somewhere Sunny
 2015: Garden Music
 2016: Vicious
 2017: Ever Mindful 2018: Magic Scout: A Calm Experience 2018: Laserpack 2019: Dream Catcher 2019: Flying Kerfufle 2019: Le Grand Chase 2019: Crusade: Heavy Industry 2019: OnionCapers 2019: Envision 2019: Glitter Blast 2019: Leaving Home 2019: Magistar 2019: Midnight Tale 2019: River Flute 2019: Symmetry 2019: Sovereign
 2019: Hustle Hard
 2019: Almost Bliss
 2019: Beauty Flow
 2019: Half Mystery
 2019: Past Sadness
 2019: Raving Energy
 2019: Rising Tide
 2019: Tyrant
 2019: Sincerely
 2019: Celebration
 2019: Deep and Dirty
 2019: Fuzzball Parade
 2019: Lotus
 2019: Realizer
 2019: Stay the Course
 2019: Verano Sensual
 2019: Wholesome 2019: Farting Around 2019: Aquarium 2019: Monkeys Spinning Monkeys 2019: A Kevin MacLeod Xmas 2019: Folk? 2019: Menagerie 2020: Worldish 2019: Scheming Weasel (Peukie Remix) 2020: What You Want 2020: Island Music 2020: On Hold for You 2020: Canons in D 2020: Project 80s 2021: World 2021: Now That's Now! 2021: Night in the Castle 2021: Adventures in Adventureland 2021: WOTSITS!!!! 2021: Space Jazz 2021: Ethereal Relaxation 2022: Journey to Ascend 2022: Boogie Party 2023: Paradise Found 2023: Over the Moon''

References

External links 

 
 
 
 
 
 FreePD – MacLeod's public-domain music library
  
 

 
 

Living people
Musicians from Green Bay, Wisconsin
American film score composers
Musicians from New York City
20th-century American composers
21st-century American composers
1972 births
Creative Commons-licensed authors
American male film score composers
20th-century American male musicians
21st-century American male musicians